Busto is a surname. Notable people with the surname include:

Ernesto Hernández Busto (Havana, Cuba, 1968) is a Cuban writer living in Barcelona
Javier Busto (born 1949), Spanish choral music composer and conductor
Jorge Busto, Mexican film editor
José Antonio del Busto Duthurburu (1932–2006), Peruvian historian
Manu Busto (born 1980), Spanish footballer
Manuel Busto (born 1932), French former professional racing cyclist
Michael Busto (born 1986), Canadian ice hockey defenceman
Milton Busto (born 1982), Nicaraguan professional midfielder
 Busto, 1962 fado album by Amália Rodrigues

See also
El Busto, town and municipality located in the province and autonomous community of Navarre, northern Spain
Lax'n'Busto, pop-rock group formed in 1986 in El Vendrell, Catalonia
Bustelo (disambiguation)
Bustillo (disambiguation)
Buston (disambiguation)
Bustos (disambiguation)